Pictionary is a word guessing game. The term can also refer to several derivatives of the original game:
Pictionary (1989 game show)
Pictionary (1997 game show)
Pictionary (video game)